Reginald H. Sullivan (March 10, 1876 – January 30, 1980) was the 30th and 33rd mayor of the city of Indianapolis, Indiana. He is among the longest-lived Americans to ever be a mayor of any city.  He came from a political family with his father, Thomas Lennox Sullivan, being a former mayor of Indianapolis. He was also a lifelong bachelor who was among the first people entered into the "Indiana Hall of Fame" in 1974.

Biography 
Reginald H. Sullivan was born in Indianapolis on March 10, 1876. He received his education there, graduating from Wabash College in 1897 and the Indiana University School of Law in 1899.

He entered politics as a Democrat, and served as an Indiana state senator from 1910 to 1914.

He was elected Mayor of Indianapolis twice, serving from 1930 to 1934 and from 1938 to 1942.

Reginald H. Sullivan died in Indianapolis on January 30, 1980, and was buried at Crown Hill Cemetery.

References 

1876 births
1980 deaths
20th-century American politicians
American centenarians
Men centenarians
Burials at Crown Hill Cemetery
Indiana state senators
Mayors of Indianapolis